The 1994–95 Iraq FA Cup was the 18th edition of the Iraq FA Cup as a clubs-only competition. The tournament was won by Al-Zawraa for the third consecutive time and the tenth time in their history, beating Al-Jaish 3–0 in the final. The previous rounds saw Al-Zawraa beat Samarra 3–1, Diyala 3–0, Al-Karkh 4–2, Al-Shorta 3–0 and Al-Ramadi on penalties in the semi-finals at Al-Shaab Stadium on 17 April 1995. Al-Jaish reached the final by beating Al-Quwa Al-Jawiya 1–0 on the same day at Al-Kashafa Stadium. Al-Zawraa also won the 1994–95 Iraqi National League to complete their second double in a row.

Matches

Final

References

External links
 Iraqi Football Website

Iraq FA Cup
Cup